Tanner Sparks is an American audio engineer, mix engineer, record producer, and musician. Sparks has recorded multiple artists, including the double-platinum winning artist Switchfoot.

Sparks was the previous bassist for the band Destroy the Runner, guitarist for Chapter 14, and A Veil.

Discography

With Destroy the Runner:
 "Sinners" – B-side song form Saints (2009, self released)
 I, Lucifer (2008 album, Solid State Records)

With Chapter 14:
 Like Trees in November (2010 EP, self released)
 "The Bad Shephard" (2012 single, self released)

With A Veil:
 The In Between (2012 album, self released)

Technical credits

Selected discography (mixing/engineering):

References

Absolute Punk "Destroy the Runner — I, Lucifer"
San Diego Reader. Chapter 14 "We're Back,Full Throttle"
A Veil 

American rock guitarists
American male guitarists
Living people
1988 births
21st-century American guitarists
21st-century American male musicians